Leslie Spalding (born February 22, 1969) is an American professional golfer and golf coach, who played on the LPGA Tour from 1995 to 2005.

Early career
Spalding was born in Billings, Montana. As a high school student, she was the 1986-87 Montana State Class AA High School champion. After being a runner up in 1987 and 1990, she went on to win the 1991 and 1992 Montana State Women's Amateur Championships. At the University of Alabama (where she studied telecommunications and film), she was the 1990 Neva McCall/Alabama Intercollegiate champion and the 1991 Women's Southern Intercollegiate (WSIC) champion.

Spalding turned professional in August 1992. In 1993-94, prior to joining the LPGA, she competed on the Futures Tour. In 1995, she competed on the Golf Coast Tour and qualified for the LPGA Tour by tying for 16th at the LPGA Final Qualifying Tournament, to earn exempt status for the 1996 season.

Some notable LPGA Tour results:
 She has two career holes-in-one.
 Her lowest score was a 64.
 Her best result was tied for third place at the ShopRite LPGA Classic in 2001.

Later career
Spalding retired from professional golf in 2005 to become an independent golf teacher, she was first contracted by the Peter Yegen Golf Club in Billings, Montana.

Current life
Spalding was head coach of the Montana State University – Bozeman Bobcat women's golf team from 2007 to 2011.  On August 1, 2011, it was announced that Spalding resigned from Montana State  in order to accept a position at San Diego State University.

References

External links

American female golfers
Alabama Crimson Tide women's golfers
LPGA Tour golfers
College golf coaches in the United States
Golfers from Montana
Sportspeople from Billings, Montana
Sportspeople from Bozeman, Montana
1969 births
Living people